Robert Roland Ingram (born January 20, 1945) is a retired United States Navy hospital corpsman third class and a recipient of the United States' highest military decoration, the Medal of Honor, for heroism during the Vietnam War.

Military career
Ingram was born in Clearwater, Florida. He joined the United States Navy from Coral Gables, Florida in September 1963. He completed recruit training and Hospital Corps School in San Diego, California, and the Fleet Marine Force, Field Medical Service School at Camp Pendleton, California. Afterwards, he was assigned to B Company, 1st Battalion, 7th Marine Regiment, 1st Marine Division. He was then reassigned and transferred to C Company of the 1st Battalion, 7th Marines.

Ingram was sent with his battalion from Okinawa to Vietnam in July 1965 as a hospital corpsman third class. For his heroism in treating several Marines of C Company while under enemy fire on February 8, 1966, he was awarded the Silver Star. On March 28, during a firefight with North Vietnamese forces in Quang Ngai Province, Republic of Vietnam, Ingram continued to attend to wounded Marines after being seriously wounded by enemy gunfire four times.

Ingram's Medal of Honor was presented to him by President Bill Clinton on July 10, 1998 during a ceremony in the White House, alongside twenty-four of the men he served with in Vietnam. The delay in the award, made more than thirty years after the battle, was attributed to lost paperwork.

Military awards
Ingram's military awards and decorations include:

Medal of Honor citation
Ingram's official Medal of Honor citation reads:

The President of the United States in the name of The Congress takes pleasure in presenting the MEDAL OF HONOR to

for service as set forth in the following CITATION:

See also

List of Medal of Honor recipients for the Vietnam War

Notes

References

1945 births
Living people
United States Navy personnel of the Vietnam War
United States Navy Medal of Honor recipients
People from Clearwater, Florida
United States Navy corpsmen
Vietnam War recipients of the Medal of Honor
People from Coral Gables, Florida